Polaromonas hydrogenivorans is a Gram-negative, nonmotile, non-spore-forming, psychrotolerant bacterium from the genus Polaromonas, which was isolated from Alaskan forest soil. P. hydrogenivorans has the ability to oxidize hydrogen and its colonies are white.

References

External links
Type strain of Polaromonas hydrogenivorans at BacDive -  the Bacterial Diversity Metadatabase

Comamonadaceae
Bacteria described in 2007